Concordia College is a private college in Moorhead, Minnesota. Founded by Norwegian settlers in 1891, the school is associated with the Evangelical Lutheran Church in America and practices the liberal arts. Concordia is accredited by the Higher Learning Commission and has a total student enrollment of 2,531. It offers Bachelor of Arts, Bachelor of Music, Master of Education, and Master of Science in nutrition degrees.

Since Concordia was founded, it has articulated a Christian and global curriculum. Students are required to take courses in health, communication, religion, and culture. The university maintains athletic teams in 22 sports and carries 19 music ensembles, including The Concordia Choir, The Concordia Orchestra, and The Concordia Band.

History

Concordia College was dedicated as a private academy on October 31, 1891, by a group of approximately one dozen Norwegian pastors and laymen who had recently settled in the Red River Valley. The school was founded on the property of the former Episcopalian Bishop Whipple School, which had closed in 1887. English professor Ingebrikt Grose of St. Olaf College was asked to preside over the academy, which at that time offered mixed-sex education in English literature, natural sciences, mathematics, piano, and organ. The school opened with three faculty and twelve students.

In 1892, Rasmus Bogstad, a Norwegian pastor, raised funds to build a male dormitory on campus grounds. His efforts led to the construction of Academy Hall. In 1893, Grose resigned and recently hired business professor Hans Aaker took his place. Aaker became mayor of Moorhead in 1900 and left two years later when that job compromised his dedication to the school. Bogstad was appointed Concordia's next president and established its liberal tradition. Under Bogstad, Concordia constructed a new academic building, now called Old Main.

Henry O. Shurson held the presidency after Bogstad resigned in 1910 until Johan A. Aasgaard was appointed in 1911. Under Aasgaard, the nearby Park Region College and Bruflat Academy were merged with Concordia, and a new library was built in what is now called Grose Hall. In 1925, John N. Brown became president and oversaw Concordia's accreditation by the North Central Association in 1927. Eleven years later, a female dormitory was built, named Fjelstad Hall, and in 1947, a male dormitory was built, later called Brown Hall.

Joseph "Prexy Joe" Knutson became president in 1951, and presided over the construction of 16 buildings and the increase in enrollment to 1592 students. Under his leadership, the Concordia Annual Fund, which continues today, was established to raise money for the college's interests. Dr. Paul J. Dovre took the presidency in 1975 and oversaw new college programs and articulated Concordia's Lutheran mission. Since 1999, the college has been presided by Thomas W. Thomsen, who implemented the design for a new campus center, and Dr. Pamela M. Jolicoeur, who established plans for the college's Offutt School of Business. Construction on the Offutt School of Business was completed in late 2012, and hosted students in the fall semester of 2013. Today, the school is led by Dr. William J. Craft.

Academics
Concordia is accredited by the Higher Learning Commission. It enrolls 2,531 students and offers 61 majors and 12 pre-professional programs. Master of Education degrees are offered, and the most popular majors are business, education, and communication.

The college upholds a curriculum that centers on a Christian and global perspective. Affiliated with the Evangelical Lutheran Church in America, Concordia practices the liberal arts from the Lutheran theological tradition. Faculty are encouraged to retain Becoming Responsibly Engaged in the World (BREW) as a thematic focus in their instructions. The college operates by a semester calendar and first-year students are required to take courses in health, communication, religion, and culture. An honors program is offered for motivated students.

Concordia is included in the Open Doors survey of the top twenty baccalaureate institutions that send students abroad. The college offers four global education programs and offers instruction in nine languages. Moreover, students are permitted to study at two neighboring universities, Minnesota State University Moorhead and North Dakota State University, for course credit to their degrees.

Student life

Music 
The college maintains five choirs, three bands, two orchestras, three jazz ensembles, two percussion ensembles, and two handbell choirs. Music education began with the college's 1891 formation, when piano and organ lessons were taught by one instructor. The college has since expanded to include a music department of 45 faculty that offers five Bachelor of Music degrees and two Bachelor of Arts degrees.
 
The Concordia Choir is a 78-member mixed choir that travels internationally and has performed at major performance venues, including Carnegie Hall and the Kennedy Center. The choir was founded in 1919 by the college's voice instructor and began touring in 1923 under the direction of Herman Monson. The choir grew to national prominence in the following decades when Paul J. Christiansen became the director. Christiansen remained in the position for 49 years until composer René Clausen took over in 1986. Under Clausen, The Concordia Choir has released numerous recordings and has performed with the King's Singers. He was succeeded in 2020 by Micheal Culloton.

The college has put on an annual Christmas concert since 1927 that remains a tradition of the local community. From its inception, it has featured the music department's choirs and orchestra. In 1940, Christianson began working with painter Cyrus M. Running to incorporate murals with the concert to reflect the music's themes. Running completed the designs until 1978, when their development was taken over by David J. Hetland, whose murals have traditionally extended . After Hetland's 2006 death, mural designs were taken over by artist Paul Johnson. The concert is currently performed four times annually on Concordia's campus and twice annually at Orchestra Hall. Over 450 students perform for an audience of twenty thousand, and the concert is broadcast on radio and television. The 2009 concert, Journey to Bethlehem, was recorded by Twin Cities Public Television and won a regional Emmy. It was broadcast nationally by members of the Public Broadcasting Service.

Athletics 

Concordia–Moorhead athletic teams are the Cobbers. The college is a member of the Division III level of the National Collegiate Athletic Association (NCAA), primarily competing in the Minnesota Intercollegiate Athletic Conference (MIAC) since the 1921–22 academic year.

Concordia–Moorhead competes in 20 intercollegiate varsity sports, in which more than 800 students participate. Men's sports include baseball, basketball, cross country, football, golf, ice hockey, soccer, tennis, track & field, and wrestling; while women's sports include basketball, cross country, golf, ice hockey, soccer, softball, swimming & diving, tennis, track & field, and volleyball.

Origins 
Athletics began when a baseball club was organized in 1903 and a basketball team was formed after the construction of a gymnasium in 1907. Football emerged in 1916 and Concordia joined the MIAC in 1920. Soon after, teams for tennis, golf, wrestling, softball, volleyball, track, cross country running and others were formed.

Athletics grew further when Jake Christiansen, brother of conductor Paul J. Christiansen, was appointed physical education director in 1941. He coached the football team to five conference championships over his 28-year career. In 1952, Christiansen designed a new athletic facility that promoted the college's reputation in the region. One of Christiansen's former students, Jim Christopherson, took over coaching in 1969 and led the team to nine conference titles and two national championships. Both coaches have been inducted in the College Football Hall of Fame.

The 1982 Concordia–Moorhead women's basketball team defeated Mount Mercy, 73–72, to capture the Cobbers' first AIAW Division III national championship. The Cobbers defeated St. John Fisher in the 1988 NCAA Division III championship game, 65–57, to claim the Cobbers' first NCAA national title.

Notable faculty 
Notable faculty include:
 Basit Bilal Koshul, Pakistani researcher writer and editor
 Chris Coste, head coach, baseball
 Hiram Drache, historian-in-residence
 Rich Glas, athletic director and men's basketball head coach
 Marcus J. Borg, (1942–2015) American New Testament scholar and theologian. Among the most widely known and influential voices in progressive Christianity.

Notable alumni 
Cynthia L. Bauerly, member of the Federal Election Commission
William F. Beck – Lutheran pastor, author of The Holy Bible, An American Translation of the Bible
Barry Bennett, former defensive lineman for the New Orleans Saints, New York Jets and Minnesota Vikings
Alan Bjerga, president of the National Press Club
Marianne C. Brown, businesswoman
Jim Christopherson, former linebacker and placekicker for the Minnesota Vikings
Chris Coste, former Major league baseball catcher and infielder
Kevin Cramer, current United States Senator for North Dakota
Gabriel Hauge, administrative assistant to President Eisenhower, chairman of the Board of Manufacturers Hanover
Clint Hill, United States Secret Service agent credited with saving the life of Jacqueline Kennedy during the assassination of John F. Kennedy
David Joerger, current head coach of the Sacramento Kings
Leon H. Johnson, president of Montana State University (1964-1969)
Coya Knutson, former United States congresswoman
Gary Larsen, defensive tackle for the Minnesota Vikings, member of Purple People Eaters
Adolph Murie, first biologist to study wolves in their natural habitat
Ole H. Olson, former Governor of North Dakota
Sidney Rand, former United States Ambassador to Norway and President of St. Olaf College.
Roxana Saberi, journalist charged with espionage by Iran and released in 2009
Olaf Storaasli, former NASA & Oak Ridge National Laboratory scientist
Arlene Buckneberg Ydstie, composer
Phyllis Zimmerman, composer, choral conductor
Brandon Zylstra, wide receiver for the Detroit Lions

References

Bibliography

External links 

 
 Official athletics website

 
Liberal arts colleges in Minnesota
Lutheranism in Minnesota
Education in Fargo–Moorhead
Education in Clay County, Minnesota
Educational institutions established in 1892
Buildings and structures in Clay County, Minnesota
Tourist attractions in Clay County, Minnesota
Moorhead, Minnesota
Private universities and colleges in Minnesota
1892 establishments in Minnesota